Beetzendorf-Diesdorf is a Verbandsgemeinde ("collective municipality") in the Altmarkkreis Salzwedel (district), in Saxony-Anhalt, Germany. Until 1 January 2010, it was a Verwaltungsgemeinschaft. It is situated southwest of Salzwedel. The seat of the Verbandsgemeinde is in Beetzendorf.

The Verbandsgemeinde Beetzendorf-Diesdorf consists of the following municipalities:

Apenburg-Winterfeld
Beetzendorf
Dähre 
Diesdorf
Jübar 
Kuhfelde 
Rohrberg 
Wallstawe

References

Verbandsgemeinden in Saxony-Anhalt